(in English, Saint-Raymond museum) is the archeological museum of Toulouse, opened in 1892. The site originally was a necropolis, and in later constructions was a hospital for the poor and pilgrims, prison, student residence, stables, barracks and presbytery, eventually becoming a museum in 1891. It is housed in the former Saint-Raymond university college dating from the sixteenth century that borders Basilica of Saint-Sernin.

The building has been renovated and reconstructed several times. It preserves and exhibits archaeological collections from protohistory to the early Middle Ages, mainly from the Celtic, Roman and early Christian periods, much from the Toulouse region.

History of the building
Originally a Christian necropolis dating from the 4th century was located here and stretched on either side of the Roman road close to the Basilica of Saint-Sernin.

Between 1075-1080, on the site of the present building was a hospital for the poor and for pilgrims travelling the Way of St. James on the French Way from Arles via Toulouse, founded by Raymond Gayrard and financed by the Count of Toulouse.
By the 13th century, at the time the University of Toulouse was created the house had been acquired by the inquisitor Bernard de Caux, who used it as a prison for heretics. In 1249 the inquisitor offered the house to the abbot of Saint-Sernin in gratitude for his services to the defence of the faith, specifying that the College of Saint-Raymond should be reserved for poor students, as recorded in a 1250 act. The college continued in that purpose until the French Revolution.

After a great fire, at the end of the 13th century, Martin de Saint-André, bishop of Carcassonne, rebuilt on the same site. The current building, dating to 1523, was the work of the mason Louis Privat, who would later build the Hôtel de Bernuy for a rich woad merchant, Jean de Bernuy. It was financed in part by Martin de Saint-André (fr), prior of the college and his father, Pierre de Saint-André (fr).

The city of Toulouse bought the building in 1836 to use for a variety of functions, such as stables and barracks. In 1852-1853, during the redevelopment of the Place Saint-Sernin, it was the only building to escape demolition, due to the intervention of Alexandre Du Mège, Prosper Mérimée and Eugène Viollet-le-Duc.

Between 1868-1871, it was restored by Eugene Viollet-le-Duc, who removed the remains of the demolished chapel and built a fourth corner turret, added two interior walls and numerous crenellated chimneys that accented the medieval appearance of the structure. Viollet-le-Duc also built a neo-gothic house in the old courtyard of the college, that became a garden. The building then served as a presbytery to the Saint-Sernin Basilica until 1890.

It is one of the rare surviving examples of Toulouse university architecture from the late Middle Ages.

History of the museum
By a municipal decree of 14 April 1891, the building became a "museum of ancient and exotic decorative arts" and was inaugurated on 24 April 1892 by Toulouse mayor Camille Ournac in the presence of Jean Jaurès, city councilor.

It was dedicated for "small antiquities", small items (ethnographic objects, art objects, furniture, coins and medals and archaeological objects) from all periods. It thus served to unburden the Musée des Augustins, that was still under renovation, of objects it was impossible to display there. The building was adapted to its new functions by the architect Arthur Romestin, when stairs, partitions and cupboards were altered to create larger exhibition spaces. Several additional windows were created to provide better light.

The museum was thoroughly reorganized by a new curator, Émile Cartailhac, who took over in 1912. In 1935 Henri Ramet (fr) named it the Cluny museum in Toulouse. The Society of Friends of the Saint-Raymond Museum and ancient art was founded in 1939. The museum was again rebuilt in 1946-1950 by Robert Mesuret, listed as a Monument historique on 11 August 1975 and its upper parts were restored in 1981-1982 to return them to their condition before the intervention of Viollet-le-Duc. In 1949, under the direction of Robert Mesuret, it became the archeological museum of Toulouse, receiving the collections of Antiquity and the Early Middle Ages of the city of Toulouse.

Due to its age, between 1978 and 1982, a new rehabilitation project of the entire museum was launched under the direction of Yves Boiret, then chief architect of French Historic Monuments. The work began in 1981-82 with the refurbishment of the roof, that regained the appearance it had before the restoration by Viollet-Le-Duc and allowed the development of a second level below the roof. In the following years, among a lot of controversy, Boiret rehabilitates the nearby basilica of Saint Sernin. In 1980, the City of Toulouse acquired a neighboring building at 11 rue des Trois-Renards to relocate its offices, technical services and library, to provide and additional 2,500 m2 of exhibition space for the public.

Between 1992 and 1994, a building was constructed in the Bourrassol district of Toulouse to house the reserve collections. A new redevelopment study was carried out under the direction of Bernard Voinchet, the chief architect of Historic Monuments in 1992, and in 1994 a complete reorganization was arranged by Dominique Baudis, Mayor of Toulouse.

Between 1994 and 1996, archaeological excavations were undertaken to uncover the necropolis of Saint-Sernin, near the tomb of the martyred saint Saturnin, and his burials dating to the 4th century. A lime kiln dating from the 5th or 6th century was also discovered, and with about a hundred sepulchres and severals inscriptions viewable today. After more than four years renovation the museum reopened to the public on Saturday, 8 May 1999 having been restored to its original 1523 appearance, while a part of the ancient early Christian necropolis, dating from the fourth and fifth centuries, has been excavated.

Museum curators
 Ernest Roschach (1892-)
 Casimir Destrem
 Henri Rachou
 Emile Cartailhac (1912-1921)
 Jules Fourcade (1922-
 Eugène-Humbert Guitard (1935-1948)
 Robert Mesuret (1949-1972)
 Jacqueline Labrousse (1972-1985)
 Daniel Cazes (1985-2009)
 Evelyne Ugaglia (2010-2018)
 Laure Barthet (2018-

Transfer and distribution of Toulouse collections
 1892: monumental works remained at the Museum of the Augustins and small objects were transferred from the Musée Saint-Raymond
 1931: the ethnographic collection was transferred to the Natural History Museum of Toulouse
 1950: the ancient lapidary collections were transferred from the Musée des Augustins to the Musée Saint-Raymond
 1961: transfer to the Paul-Dupuy Museum of collections after the Merovingian period

Collections

Formation
The original collection originated from the collections of the Académie des sciences, inscriptions et belles-lettres de Toulouse (fr), and the Royal Academy of Painting, Sculpture and Architecture, seized during the French Revolution giving birth to the Provisional Museum of the Republic installed in the Augustinian convent of Toulouse in 1793. The sculptures, discovered in the ancient Roman villa of Chiragan during the excavations conducted between 1826 and 1830 by Alexandre Du Mège, who became curator in 1832, were incorporated in the Museum of Antiquities arranged in the galleries of the cloister of the museum. The public can discover a remarkable ensemble along the Gallery of the Emperors and the Gallery of La Venus that can only be compared to the Louvre.

Founded in 1831, the Archaeological Society of the Midi of France (fr) contributed to the enrichment of collections allowing the acquisition of major pieces for the collection, such as the torques of Fenouillet and portraits of Béziers, in addition to receiving other offerings or donations. In 1893 the museum gave up an important collection to the city for an annuity.

Collectors have benefited from the enrichment of the museum with the donations of Antoine Bibent of objects from Pompeii, in 1831, the Count of Clarac donated Greek and Etruscan vases in 1843, Edward Barry gave small bronzes, and in 1862 the state deposited part of the Campana collection. Many other acquisitions were made in the late 19th and early 20th centuries.

The curator, Jules Fourcade acquired many pieces of ironwork from Toulouse and under the direction of Robert Mesuret, from 1961, after several movements of the collections, the museum mainly specialises in archeology and has become the Museum of Antiques of Toulouse.

Excavations carried out by the Regional Service of Archeology (SRA) contributed greatly to the increase of the collections during the years 1980-1990.

From prehistory to eleventh century
For the protohistory, the museum has bracelets, fibulae and axes from the Bronze Age, and bracelets and leg rings in gold from Fenouillet and Lasgraisses for the Iron Age and more precisely from the time of the Volques Tectosages (fr). The rest of the Iron Age collections come from the Cluzel, Estarac and Vieille-Toulouse sites.

Several civilizations of the Mediterranean are represented: Cypriot and Etruscan pieces, Greek and Italian vases from the eighth to the first century BC and Hellenistic terracotta figurines.

The museum has a very important Roman collection, with ornate oil lamps, sigillated vases from Montans and La Graufesenque, keys and figures of bonzes, mosaics from the end of the Roman Empire from Sigognac, Granéjouls, Saint-Rustice and Saint-Pierre-des-Cuisines, many epigraphs with a set of votive altars.

The very rich collection of Roman busts were discovered partly in the ruins of the Roman villa at Chiragan in Martres-Tolosane, and partly in Béziers in 1844, which makes the museum's collection the second largest after the Louvre. The busts includes many emperors and their families but also, as yet unidentified, magistrates, soldiers, men, women and children. The discoveries of the villa Chiragan also cover reliefs of the Labours of Hercules, statues and busts of the Greco-Roman deities.

The museum holds an important collection of coins of Greek, Gallic, Iberian, Roman, Byzantine and Merovingian origins. The early Christian and early medieval collections include sculptures, inscriptions, lamps, liturgical vases, ceramics, jewelry, fibulae and belt buckles from Visigothic Spain, Lauragais and Ariège department.

Museography

Original museography

Ground floor
 Toulouse room with objects on the history of Toulouse and its monuments
 Exotic room with collections of Roquemaurel

First floor
 Egyptian, Greek and Etruscan antiquities room (Clarac collection, Campana deposit, Dugua collection)
 Gallic and Roman Room (Barry Collection)
 Room of the Middle Ages and Renaissance objects
On 30 December 1923, a new ground floor room was inaugurated for temporary exhibitions.

1950s
From the 1950s reserves are accessible to researchers.

Ground floor
 Antique lapidary collections room (Chiragan) and an epigraphy gallery
 Greek ceramic room

First floor
 Room of the Middle Ages and Renaissance objects
From 1961 the first floor rooms were emptied of their collections and hosted temporary exhibitions.

Since 1999
After the renovation work of the 1990s, the museum has almost exclusively been dedicated to Roman and early Christian Toulouse, and with its exhibition spaces, the opening to the public of the basement and the second floor adding to the existing two levels, the collections are now spread over four floors.

The second and last floor is dedicated to the Tolosa in the pre-Roman and Roman province of Narbonne. The first floor displays the collection of Roman sculptures found in the Roman villa of Chiragan.

The ground floor accommodates temporary exhibitions in the former tinel, a hall of honor where the student community gathered. In the basement are the early Christian necropolis, developed at the time the first basilica housing the body of Saint-Saturnin was built, sarcophagi and funerary inscriptions and a lime kiln.

Attendance 
Graph showing museum attendance between 2001 and 2018.

Other missions
Besides displaying its collections, the Musée Saint-Raymond manages the following archaeological and historical sites:
 Roman Amphitheater at Toulouse-Purpan and the thermae in the Ancely (fr) quarter
 Saint-Pierre des Cuisines Church
 Basilica of Saint-Sernin

References
Original French text

Sources

External links 

 

Archaeological museums in France
History museums in France
Museums in Toulouse